The 1922 Erskine Seceders football team represented Erskine College in the 1922 college football season.

Schedule

References

Erskine
Erskine Flying Fleet football seasons
College football winless seasons
Erskine Seceders football